Randy VanWarmer (also written as Vanwarmer, Van Warmer; March 30, 1955 – January 12, 2004) was an American singer-songwriter and guitarist. His biggest success was the pop hit, "Just When I Needed You Most". It reached No. 8 on the UK Singles Chart in September 1979 after peaking at No. 4 on the Billboard Hot 100 and No. 1 on Billboard Hot Adult Contemporary Tracks earlier that year.

He wrote several songs for the group The Oak Ridge Boys including the No. 1 U.S. Country hit "I Guess It Never Hurts to Hurt Sometimes". The song appeared on his 1981 album Beat of Love, which also included the pop tune "Suzi Found a Weapon", which hit No. 55 on the Billboard Hot 100.

Career
He was born Randall Van Wormer, in Indian Hills, Colorado, United States, the son of Roger Van Wormer (1919–1967) and Betsy (née Harry; 1919–2006). At 15, three years after the death of his father in an automobile accident, he moved with his mother to Cornwall, England. His experiences there inspired "Just When I Needed You Most".

In a 1989 interview with Release, a now-defunct independent paper from Stanford, California, Van Warmer said that Albert Grossman, the head of Bearsville, would not let him do television or tour the United States, a strategy that did not prove successful.

His follow-up album, Terraform, was dark and (compared to his previous work) almost alternative. According to Release, Terraform sold moderately in Japan and Australia. VanWarmer would later publicly rue his decision to turn away from dreamy ballads. He made two more records at Bearsville: Beat of Love and The Things That You Dream. Beat of Love included the single "Suzi Found a Weapon", a tribute to a Bearsville public relations rep whom VanWarmer would later woo and marry, and which went to No. 1 in Alaska and gained a certain amount of post mortem acclaim (for example, a review by James A. Gardner in AllMusic). But Grossman died soon thereafter, and VanWarmer's future was in doubt.

According to Release, in the mid-1980s Suzi VanWarmer mailed a song called "I Guess It Never Hurts to Hurt Sometimes" from Beat of Love to a friend at MCA, who sent it to Ron Chancey, the producer of the Oak Ridge Boys. They put it on their next album. Charley Pride recorded a song of VanWarmer's, as did Michael Johnson. Moving to Nashville, VanWarmer saw a recording of his song, "I'm in a Hurry (And Don't Know Why)", also No. 1 on the country chart by Alabama.

His final album was a tribute to Stephen Foster, released posthumously only in Japan. According to the CD's liner notes, VanWarmer played all the instruments. The notes also indicate that he completed work on the record a few days after learning he had leukemia; he died at 48, one day before the anniversary of Foster's death.

In line with one of his greatest loves, some of his cremated remains were sent into space in 2007 and then again in 2012 aboard the first successful private space flight to the International Space Station, the SpaceX Dragon vehicle.

Death
VanWarmer died on January 12, 2004, at the age of 48, in Seattle. He had been suffering from leukemia for the previous year. He is survived by his widow Suzi and his brothers Dave, Mark, and Ron.

Discography

Albums
Warmer – 1979
Terraform – 1980
Beat of Love – 1981
The Things That You Dream – 1983
I Am – 1988
Every Now and Then – 1990
The Third Child – 1994
The Vital Spark – 1994 (Alternate title: I Will Whisper Your Name)
Sun, Moon and Stars – 1996
Sings Stephen Foster – 2005
Songwriter – 2006

Singles

References

External links
Official site - dead link

1955 births
2004 deaths
People from Jefferson County, Colorado
American people of Dutch descent
Deaths from leukemia
American male singer-songwriters
Space burials
American rock guitarists
American male guitarists
American rock singers
American rock songwriters
American soft rock musicians
Deaths from cancer in Washington (state)
American expatriates in the United Kingdom
20th-century American singers
20th-century American guitarists
Guitarists from Colorado
20th-century American male singers
Bearsville Records artists
Singer-songwriters from Colorado